The 2019 Nigerian House of Representatives elections in Enugu State was held on February 23, 2019, to elect members of the House of Representatives to represent Enugu State, Nigeria.

Overview

Summary

Results

Aninri/Awgu/Oji River 
A total of 12 candidates registered with the Independent National Electoral Commission to contest in the election. PDP candidate Toby Okechukwu won the election, defeating APC VinMartin Obiora Ilo and 10 other party candidates. Okechukwu received 80% of the votes, while Ilo received 13.32%.

Enugu East/Isi-Uzo 
A total of 10 candidates registered with the Independent National Electoral Commission to contest in the election. PDP candidate Prince Cornelius Nnaji won the election, defeating APC Ebenyi Kingsley and 8 other party candidates. Nnaji received 79.36% of the votes, while Kingsley received 20.22%.

Enugu North/Enugu South 
A total of 13 candidates registered with the Independent National Electoral Commission to contest in the election. PDP candidate Ofor Gregory Chukwuegbo won the election, defeating APC Maduka Nelson Arum and 11 other party candidates. Chukwuegbo received 69.12% of the votes, while Arum received 24.93%.

Ezeagu/Udi 
A total of 13 candidates registered with the Independent National Electoral Commission to contest in the election. PDP candidate Dennis Amadi won the election, defeating APC Mmaniel Joseph Onyemadi and 11 other party candidates. Amadi received 81.99% of the votes, while Onyemadi received 12.31%.

Igbo-Etiti/Uzo-Uwani 
A total of 11 candidates registered with the Independent National Electoral Commission to contest in the election. PDP candidate Martins Oke won the election, defeating APC Jonathan Chukwuma and 9 other party candidates. Oke received 83.87% of the votes, while Chukwuma received 13.60%.

Igboeze North/Udenu 
A total of 12 candidates registered with the Independent National Electoral Commission to contest in the election. PDP candidate Simon Chukwuemeka Atigwe won the election, defeating APC Kentus Eze and 10 other party candidates. Atigwe received 85.95% of the votes, while Eze received 13.64%.

Nkanu East/Nkanu West 
A total of 11 candidates registered with the Independent National Electoral Commission to contest in the election. PDP candidate Nnolim Nnaji won the election, defeating APC Anthony Okwudili Nwafor and 9 other party candidates. Nnaji received 85.18% of the votes, while Nwafor received 7.65%.

Nsukka/Igbo-Eze South 
A total of 8 candidates registered with the Independent National Electoral Commission to contest in the election. PDP candidate Patrick Asadu won the election, defeating APC Ikechukwu Ugwede and 6 other party candidates. Asadu received 83.1% of the votes, while Ugwede received 16.53%.

References 

Enugu State House of Representatives elections
House of Representatives
Enugu